Fushun County may refer to two counties of the People's Republic of China:

Fushun County, Liaoning (抚顺县)
Fushun County, Sichuan (富顺县)